Phoenix 23 are a five piece band from Northern Ireland. Formed in 2007, they consist of four cousins, Gav Campbell, Neil Donnelly, Glenn Donnelly and Andy Cochrane. As drummer they have their close friend, Deano.

They had three songs in the soundtrack for the Ben Kingsley film Fifty Dead Men Walking, directed by Kari Skogland; two songs which were written solely for the film; "Hit the Ground Running" (featured in Empire  magazine), and "It’s a Blast", along with "Hurricane".

Their debut album was produced by Supertramp’s guitarist Carl Verheyen, who also guests on lead guitar. It featured  drummer/percussionist Steve DiStanislao and was produced by Bernard Matthews.

In 2010, they had airplay on Cool FM in Northern Ireland, along with having reviews in Ireland, Italy  and California.

Gav Campbell

Gav Campbell is the lead singer and songwriter for the band. He can play both drums and guitar, but is currently also a guitarist in the band. He has been a DJ on Cool FM, a station covering the Greater Belfast area, he now works behind the scenes. His sister Tina Campbell is a presenter on UTV.

References

Rock music groups from Northern Ireland
Musical groups established in 2007